The Direct Marketing Association of South Africa (DMASA) is a Section 21 Company and self-regulatory organization empowered by law to ensure that direct marketers adhere to a strict code of practice, and to protect the rights of consumers when buying from direct marketing organisations.

The DMA's website carries a national opt-out database where, once registered, users will not be contacted by any member companies of the DMA.

See also
 Direct marketing associations

References

External links
 
 The DMA National OPT OUT Database
The link on the database is incorrect as above - correct one to use is  https://www.nationaloptout.org/

Direct marketing
Marketing organizations
Business organisations based in South Africa
Marketing companies of Africa